Epigomphus westfalli is a species of dragonfly in the family Gomphidae. It is endemic to Nicaragua.  Its natural habitats are subtropical or tropical moist lowland forests and rivers. It is threatened by habitat loss.

Sources

Endemic fauna of Nicaragua
Insects of Central America
Gomphidae
Taxonomy articles created by Polbot
Insects described in 1986